Božo Petek was the author of two books on model aircraft building published in Slovene in 1946 and 1953.

In 1954 he won the Levstik Award for  Letalsko modelarstvo: motorni modeli (Model Aircraft Building: Motor Planes).

Published works

 Letalsko modelarstvo: jadralni modeli (Model Aircraft Building: Gliders), 1946
 Vazduhoplovno modelarstvo (his 1946 book translated into Serbo-Croatian), 1948
 Letalsko modelarstvo: motorni modeli (Model Aircraft Building: Motor Planes), 1953

References 

Levstik Award laureates